The 1967 Copa Libertadores Finals were the two-legged final that decided the winner of the 1967 Copa Libertadores, the 8th edition of the Copa Libertadores de América, South America's premier international club football tournament organized by CONMEBOL.

The finals were contested in two-legged home-and-away format between Argentine team Racing Club de Avellaneda
and Uruguayan team Nacional. The first leg was hosted by Racing at Estadio Presidente Perón of Avellaneda on 15 August 1967, while the second leg was played at Estadio Centenario in Montevideo on 25 August 1967.

After both games were drawn, a third game was hosted at Estadio Nacional in Santiago de Chile on 29 August 1967. Racing beat Nacional by 2–1 therefore winning their 1st. Copa Libertadores title.

Qualified teams

Stadiums

Match details

First leg

Second leg

Playoff

References

1967
1
L
L
1967 in Uruguayan football
1967 in Argentine football
Football in Avellaneda
Football in Montevideo